Vladimir Veniaminovich Radionov (born 21 July 1938) is a Russian football player, coach and official.

He served as a General Secretary of the Russian Football Union from 1992 to 2004 and also was a member of the FIFA technical committee and a member of the UEFA European Championship organizing committee.

External links
 

1938 births
People from Tyumen Oblast
Living people
Soviet footballers
Russian footballers
JK Tallinna Kalev players
FC Lokomotiv Moscow players
Soviet football managers
FC Lokomotiv Moscow managers
Association football defenders
Expatriate footballers in Estonia
Sportspeople from Tyumen Oblast